The North West University No 2 Ground is a cricket ground in Potchefstroom, South Africa. It has hosted senior cricket since 2010, when it was one of three venues used for the ICC Women's Cricket Challenge.

References

Cricket grounds in South Africa
North-West University
Sports venues in North West (South African province)